Kalippava is a 1972 Indian Malayalam-language film, directed by A. B. Raj. The film stars Sathyan, Kaviyoor Ponnamma, Adoor Bhasi and Thikkurissy Sukumaran Nair. The film had musical score by B. A. Chidambaranath.

Cast
Sathyan
Kaviyoor Ponnamma
Adoor Bhasi
Thikkurissy Sukumaran Nair
Ambika
K. P. Ummer
Vijayanirmala

Soundtrack
The music was composed by B. A. Chidambaranath and the lyrics were written by Sugathakumari.

References

External links
 

1972 films
1970s Malayalam-language films
Films directed by A. B. Raj